Oh Daddy may refer to:

 "Oh Daddy" (Fleetwood Mac song), a 1977 song by Fleetwood Mac from the album Rumours
 "Oh Daddy," a 1989 song by Adrian Belew from the album Mr. Music Head
 Oh, Daddy!, a 1935 film directed by  Graham Cutts and Austin Melford